Finland competed at the 1988 Summer Paralympics in Seoul, South Korea. 62 competitors from Finland won 50 medals including 11 gold, 23 silver and 16 bronze and finished 22nd in the medal table.

See also 
 Finland at the Paralympics
 Finland at the 1988 Summer Olympics

References 

1988
1988 in Finnish sport
Nations at the 1988 Summer Paralympics